Antonio Ordóñez Araujo (16 February 1932 – 19 December 1998) was a Spanish bullfighter.

Early life
Antonio Jiménez Ordóñez Araujo was born in Ronda, Spain, on 16 February 1932. His father was Cayetano Ordóñez, called Niño de la Palma, the prototype for the character of Pedro Romero, the matador in Ernest Hemingway’s novel The Sun Also Rises.

Career
He was one of the top bullfighters of his time.  As a matador, Ordóñez faced over 3,000 bulls.  He retired in 1968, having fought over 60 bullfights in that year alone, but came back until finally retiring in 1988.

Social life

Ordóñez met a number of writers and actors, and he also starred in a few films. Antonio was a long time friend of Ernest Hemingway, whom he called Father Ernesto. Hemingway wrote an account of Ordóñez's rivalry with the matador Luis Miguel Dominguín (also Ordóñez's brother-in-law) titled The Dangerous Summer. Ordóñez also befriended Hollywood movie star Orson Welles, whose ashes were buried on Ordóñez's estate after Welles's death.

Family

Ordóñez was married to Carmen Cristina González.  They had two children, Ana Belén Ordóñez and Carmen Ordóñez.  Carmen married the matador Paquirri (killed by a bull in 1984).  His grandchildren, by daughter Carmen, are bullfighters Francisco Rivera Ordóñez and Cayetano Rivera Ordóñez.

Death

Ordóñez died of liver cancer on 19 December 1998.

Legacy
He was honored with a monument at the gates of La Malagueta bullring in Málaga and his ashes lie beneath the "toril" gate, opened to allow the bull to enter, in the oldest bullring in the world, in his home town of Ronda. His family owned the arena. There is a statue of him outside the arena.

Filmography
 Sol, playa y toros II. Bilbao - San Sebastián (1969)
 Toros y fiestas (1968)
 Historias de la fiesta (1965)
 La becerrada (1963)
 Tarde taurina (1957)

Honours 
 Gold Medal of Merit in Labour (Kingdom of Spain, 24 December 1998).

Notes

References
Antonio Ordóñez, Spanish matador in Encyclopædia Britannica
Hemingway, Ernest (1985). The Dangerous Summer; London: Hamish Hamilton Ltd;

External links
Portal Taurino article

1998 deaths
1932 births
Spanish bullfighters
People from Ronda
Sportspeople from the Province of Málaga
Deaths from cancer in Spain
Deaths from liver cancer